Joseph Murphy may refer to:

Politicians
Joseph Murphy (Irish politician), Irish independent politician who represented Dublin County, 1927–32
Joseph Richard Murphy (1880–1944), Canadian politician
Joseph Warner Murphy (1892–1977), Canadian Member of Parliament
Joseph P. Murphy (1899–?), American politician, Wisconsin State Assemblyman
Joseph L. Murphy (1907–1973), American politician in Massachusetts 
Joseph C. Murphy (1907–1987), American politician, Michigan State Representative

Sportsmen
Joe Murphy (baseball) (1866–1951), pitcher in Major League Baseball
Joe Murphy (footballer, born 1873) (1873–?), English football player for Hibernian, Stoke City, Arsenal and Raith Rovers
Joe Murphy (American football) (1897–1940), Texas A&M University–Commerce head football coach
Joe Murphy (Australian footballer) (1931–1985), Australian rules footballer
Joe Murphy (hurler) (1947–2009), Irish hurler
Joe Murphy (ice hockey) (born 1967), Canadian ice hockey player
Joseph Murphy (equestrian) (born 1976), Irish equestrian
Joe Murphy (footballer, born 1981), Irish football player for Scunthorpe United and Coventry City

Others
Joseph Murphy (author) (1898–1981), author and lecturer on the subconscious
Joseph Anthony Murphy (1857–1939), Roman Catholic bishop in Belize
Joseph F. Murphy Jr. (1944-2022), American lawyer and jurist from Maryland
Joe Murphy (actor) (1877–1961), American actor "The Gumps" etc
Joseph S. Murphy (1933–1998), American President of Queens College, President of Bennington College, and Chancellor of the City University of New York
Joseph T. Murphy (1910–1992), American lawyer and judge from Philadelphia
Joe Murphy (Irish republican) (1895–1920), hunger striker
Joey Murphy, American screenwriter and producer
Joseph Murphy (priest) (born 1968), Head of Protocol at the Holy See's Secretariat of State 
Joe Murphy (contractor) (1917-2000), Irish civil engineering contractor